Mountain Springs County Park is a park in San Diego County, California. The park encloses the site of Mountain Spring, ruins of buildings, water troughs, corrals and some of the old roads over Table Mountain to Devils Canyon, that passed by the site.

References

East County (San Diego County)